Missing the Tide is a 1918 British silent drama film directed by Walter West and starring Violet Hopson, Basil Gill and Ivy Close. The film is based on a novel by Alfred Turner. The screenplay concerns a woman who leaves her cruel husband for another man, only to discover that he has recently got married.

Cast
 Violet Hopson as Margaret Carson  
 Basil Gill as Sir Felix Faber  
 Ivy Close as Letty Fairfax 
 Gerald Ames as Capt. Harry Wyndham  
 James Lindsay as Carson  
 Nicholas Hopson Worster as The child

References

Bibliography
 Goble, Alan. The Complete Index to Literary Sources in Film. Walter de Gruyter, 1999. 
 Low, Rachael. The History of British Film, Volume III: 1914-1918. Routledge, 1997.

External links
 

1918 films
British drama films
British silent feature films
Films directed by Walter West
1918 drama films
Films based on British novels
British black-and-white films
1910s English-language films
1910s British films
Silent drama films